Cole Edward Liniak (born August 23, 1976) is an American former Major League Baseball player who played infielder from - for the Chicago Cubs. Liniak is most known in sports circles as the man the Cubs acquired for relief pitcher Rod Beck in 1999.

External links

1976 births
Living people
Chicago Cubs players
Baseball players from California
Major League Baseball infielders
Gulf Coast Red Sox players
Michigan Battle Cats players
Trenton Thunder players
Sarasota Red Sox players
Pawtucket Red Sox players
Iowa Cubs players
Syracuse SkyChiefs players
Nashua Pride players
Charlotte Rangers players
Arizona League Rangers players
Frisco RoughRiders players
Oklahoma RedHawks players
Long Island Ducks players
Nettuno Baseball Club players
American expatriate baseball players in Italy
Alaska Goldpanners of Fairbanks players